Henning Petersen (born 3 September 1939) is a former Danish cyclist. Petersen was born in Copenhagen and his profession was a driver. His sporting career began with 1.C.C. Copenhagen. He competed in the team time trial at the 1964 Summer Olympics.

References

External links
 

1939 births
Living people
Danish male cyclists
Olympic cyclists of Denmark
Cyclists at the 1964 Summer Olympics
Cyclists from Copenhagen
People from Rudersdal Municipality